Mary Kingsbury Simkhovitch (September 8, 1867 – November 15, 1951) was an American city planner and social worker.

Biography
She was born in Chestnut Hill, Massachusetts to Laura Davis Holmes (1839-1932) and Isaac Franklin Kingsbury (1841-1919). She graduated from Newton High School in 1886 and received her B.A. from Boston University, where she had been a member of Phi Beta Kappa, in 1890. During college she performed volunteer work in a teenage girls' club at Boston's St. Augustine's Episcopal Church, an African American congregation, and at "St. Monica's Home for old colored women." After graduation she taught Latin in the Somerville, Massachusetts High School for two years. In 1894 she started a year of graduate school at Radcliffe College. Two Boston organizations, the Church of the Carpenter, a Christian Socialist church founded by W. D. P. Bliss, and Denison House, a settlement house run by Helena Dudley, had a lasting influence on Simkhovitch. She visited black and immigrant families in Boston’s tenement slums, observed and documented their poverty, and became aware of the power and wealth of the city’s slumlords. In 1895 she attended the University of Berlin on a scholarship from the Women's Educational and Industrial Union. Her mother accompanied her to Europe in the summer of 1895 and stayed in Berlin while school was in session. It was there that Mary met and became engaged to Vladimir Simkhovitch (1874-1959), a Russian student of economics. During the summer of 1896 she and her friend Emily Greene Balch, the future Nobel Peace Prize winner, attended the International Socialist Trade Union Congress in London.

After London she attended Columbia University where she worked with Edwin Robert Anderson Seligman and James Harvey Robinson and boarded with the writer Anne O'Hagan Shinn.

In 1902, she and others founded the Greenwich House, a settlement house in Greenwich Village in New York City. In 1905, she was a member of the Committee of Fourteen that was seeking to reduce prostitution in New York City.

Death
She died on November 15, 1951 in New York City.

Archive
Her papers are archived at Harvard.

Publications

The Red Festival (1934)

See also 
 Settlement house

References

External links 
 Mary K. Simkhovitch Papers. Schlesinger Library , Radcliffe Institute, Harvard University.

1867 births
1951 deaths
American social workers
American women writers
Boston University alumni
Radcliffe College alumni
American urban planners
Women urban planners
Columbia University alumni